Bouguirat is a district in Mostaganem Province, Algeria. It was named after its capital, Bouguirat.

Municipalities
The district is further divided into 4 municipalities:
Bouguirat
Safsaf
Souaflia
Sirat

Districts of Mostaganem Province